From August 18–27, 2008, Tropical Storm Fay produced 50 tornadoes as it meandered across the Southeastern United States.

Background

On August 6, 2008, a tropical wave emerged over the Atlantic Ocean off the west coast of Africa. Tracking westward, the system gradually organized into a tropical depression on August 15 just west of Puerto Rico. After making landfall in the Dominican Republic, the depression intensified into Tropical Storm Fay. Turning west-northwestward, the system crossed Haiti and Cuba while gradually intensifying. The system emerged over the Florida Straits on August 18 and struck Key West before turning northeastward and striking the southern Florida Peninsula. Despite moving onshore, the system continued to organize, developing an eye and attaining peak winds just below hurricane-force.

Weakening steering currents caused Fay's motion to become slow and erratic, with the system emerging back over the Atlantic Ocean only to turn westward and strike Florida again by August 21. This slow motion continued for the remainder of the storm's track as it briefly moved back over the Gulf of Mexico before turning inland again. Weakening to a tropical depression, Fay moved slowly northwest before turning northeast over Mississippi. It turned into an extratropical cyclone on August 27 before being absorbed by a larger system over Kentucky the following day.

Daily statistics

List of tornadoes

See also

Tornadoes of 2008
List of tornadoes and tornado outbreaks
List of North American tornadoes and tornado outbreaks
List of tropical cyclone-spawned tornadoes
2008 Atlantic hurricane season

Notes

References

2008 Atlantic hurricane season
F2 tornadoes
Tornadoes of 2008
Tornadoes in Alabama
Tornadoes in Florida
Tornadoes in Georgia (U.S. state)
Tornadoes in North Carolina
Tornadoes in South Carolina
August 2008 events in the United States
Fay outbreak tornado